A Maxwell coil is a device for producing a large volume of almost constant (or constant-gradient) magnetic field. It is named in honour of the Scottish physicist James Clerk Maxwell.

A Maxwell coil is an improvement of a Helmholtz coil: in operation it provides an even more uniform magnetic field (than a Helmholtz coil), but at the expense of more material and complexity.

Description

A constant-field Maxwell coil set consists of three coils oriented on the surface of a virtual sphere. According to Maxwell's original 1873 design: each of the outer coils should be  of radius ,  and distance   from the plane of the central coil  of radius . 

Maxwell specified the number of windings as 64 for the central coil and 49 for the outer coils. Though Maxwell did not specifically state that current for the coils came from the same source, his work was specifically describing the construction of a sensitive galvanometer designed to detect a single current source. It follows that the ampere-turns for each of the smaller coils must be exactly  of the turns of the larger.

Gradient-field Maxwell coil
A gradient-field Maxwell coil is essentially the same geometry of the 3-coil configuration above, with the central coil removed to leave only the smaller two coils. If the current in one of the coils is reversed, a uniform-gradient magnetic field is produced near the centre of the two coils. Maxwell describes the use of the 2-coil configuration for the generation of a uniform force on a small test coil.

See also 
Magnetic field
Halbach array

References

Magnetic devices
Electromagnetic coils